Mullus is a subtropical marine genus of perciform fish of the family Mullidae (goatfish) and includes the red mullets, occurring mainly in the southwest Atlantic near the South American coast and in the Eastern Atlantic including the Mediterranean and the Black Sea. These fish are benthic and can be found resting and feeding over soft substrates.

Distribution 
Members of the genus Mullus can be found in the Atlantic Ocean, including the Mediterranean Sea. They are often found over soft substrates such as sand in which they search for prey using sensitive "whiskers".

Commercial Significance 
The most commercially important of these species is the Red Mullet (Mullus barbatus) which is common in Mediterranean cuisine and often fished for using seine nets, a practice thought to be damaging as it can remove large numbers of spawning fish.

Species
There are currently four recognized species in this genus:

 Mullus argentinae Hubbs & Marini, 1933 (Argentine goatfish)
 Mullus auratus Jordan & Gilbert, 1882 (Red goatfish)
 Mullus barbatus Linnaeus, 1758 (Red mullet)
 Mullus surmuletus Linnaeus, 1758 (Surmullet)

References

External links

 
Mullidae
Taxa named by Carl Linnaeus